Associazione Sportiva Dilettantistica Gallarate Calcio is an Italian football club based in the City of Gallarate (Varese), Lombardy.

Founded in 1909 as a section of the Gallaratese Gymnastic Society (active since 1876), it was subsequently transformed into an independent club, incurring several dissolutions and re-foundations. In 2018, it merged with the Unione Sportiva Crennese, which changed its name to Crennese Gallaratese, and in 2021 with the Uboldese, achieving the current status.

The club has participated in the Serie B (second national series) two times. In the 1946–1947 season of the Serie B, the club achieved its best-ever finish at the eighth position as part of Group A.

History

The beginnings (1909-early 1990s) 
The Gallaratese Gymnastics Society officially began practicing football in 1909, with the invitation from football companies of the such as Inter and Ausonia. In 1912, the team signed up for its first championship (Terza Categoria) and until 1927, the team played in the regional leagues in Lombardy.

In 1927, the team was promoted to the Second Division. In 1928, the team was admitted to the First Division. In the 1930s and 1940s, it mainly played in the Serie C and at the end of the Second World War it was officially admitted (due to enlargement of the championship) in Serie B. The team played in Serie B ifor three consecutive seasons, returning to Serie C at the end of the 1947–48 season due to the championship reform (reduction of Serie B rounds from three to one).

The club performed poorly during the 1951–52 season and was relegated to the fourth series. The fourth series has changed its name several times, to Serie D, then Interregionale, and finally C.N.D. It remained in this series for about 20 years until it was relegated to the regional championships in 1972.  In the 70s, 80s and early 90s, the team played in the Lombard championships with occasional participation in the Serie D.

The transformation to Busto Arsizio (1995) 

At the end of the 1994–1995 season, Gallaratese was promoted to Serie C2. However, when the championship was over, the club decided to move to Busto Arsizio to represent the sporting tradition of the dissolved Pro Patria et Libertate. The club changed its name to Pro Patria Gallaratese Gallarate Busto, maintaining the FIGC registration number of Gallaratese (valid for access to the fourth series). This decision left the city of Gallarate without its biggest football team.

Re-foundation and dissolution (1998-2013) 

In 1998, after three years of inactivity, the club was re-founded under the name of Società Ginnastica Gallaratese Amateur Sports Association and entered the championship of Third Category.

The quality and the loyalty of the fans allowed the "new Gallaratese" to go up again in Eccellenza within five seasons. The club remained stable in the highest category of regional football until 2007–2008, when they lost the play-off against the football club Luino Calcio.

After two consecutive seasons in Promozione, in 2010, Gallaratese acquired the sport's title of Saronno, allowing the club to play in Serie D 2010–2011. In 2012, the team relegated into Eccellenza, which they decided to join Promozione Lombardia instead.

In the meantime, the club was experiencing growing economic difficulties; at the end of the 2012–2013 championship, the club became financially unsustainable forcing them to cease operations just 15 years after the re-foundation.

The second transformation (2015 - present) 
In 2015, after two years of inactivity, a consortium of members led by Ciro Intermite, Giovanni Meneguz, and Orlando Balconi agreed with the Solbia Sommese for the transfer of the sports title (valid for enrolling in the championship of Eccellenza). However, the attempt was not successful, as the selling club finally decided to accept the offer of A.S.D. Matteotti, who used the title to re-found the Saronno (inactive for several years).

In the summer of 2016, the same consortium decided to act on its own and founded the Gallarate Amateur Sports Association, enrolling it in the Varese group of the Third Category 2016–2017 championship.

During the championship, the "New Gallaratese", made it to the top of the league, which guaranteed their promotion in Second Category.

Chronicle

Prize list

National competitions 
 Serie D:1st place
1994–1995

Regional competitions 
 Third Division: 1st place
 1924–1925

 Eccellenza: 1st place
 1991–1992

 Prima Categoria: 2nd place
 1976–1977, 2002–2003

Provincial competitions 
Terza Categoria: 2nd place
1999–2000, 2016–2017

Other prizes 
Serie C
Third place: 1941–1942

:IT:IV Serie
Third place: 1954–1955 (girone B)

Serie D
Third place: 1964–1965 (girone B), 1966–1967 (girone A), 1969–1970 (girone B)

:IT:Seconda Divisione
Third place: 1927–1928

:IT:Terza Divisione
Second place: 1922–1923, 1923–1924, 1926–1927

Promozione
Second place: 1977–1978, 1980–1981, 2003–2004

Colours and symbols

Colours 
Since its foundation, the social colors of Gallaratese are white and blue. The home uniform is a blue jersey with white shorts, while the away uniform reverses the two colors.

Official symbols

Crest 
The historical crest of the Gallaratese is a Samnite shield with alternating white and blue horizontal bands.

From this basic structure, different design versions have been developed over the years. Sometimes the shield has a golden border, while in some cases the club's name is written in full (and supplemented by the year of foundation) and in others abbreviated in the acronym SGG. The version in use between 1998 and 2013 is more elaborate: the white-blue banded shield overlaps with the corporate name (written in large letters, so as to overflow from the crest) and the design of a soccer ball in motion (emphasized by a sinuous trail that connects with the letters of the name itself). This version is sometimes in solid blue, sometimes with details in red and black.

The coat of arms of the city of Gallarate (ancile truncated silver and red to the two roosters of one in the other, with outward ornamentation from the city), which in Third millennium has assumed a predominant role, being applied to the uniforms in place of other social emblems.

Facilities

Stadium 
At the time of its foundation, in 1909, the Gallaratese football section adopted the Stadio Alessandro Maino as its home ground (named after the original politician of the city), located at the railway station, in the outbuildings of the sports club. The plant has a covered central grandstand on the west side and exposed steps on the north and east sides. Being used only for football, the stands directly overlook the edges of the playing field.

This location, poorly remodeled over the decades, has gradually revealed considerable obsolescence, so that in the two-year period 1994–1995 the team moved to the more modern Atleti Azzurri stadium in Italy, on the northern outskirts of the city. This structure was more modern, but less spacious than its last stadium (since it had a single covered grandstand on the west side). It includes an athletics track and is also used for rugby practice.

In 1998, when the club was refounded, the "Maino" returned to fill the role of the home ground, being again abandoned in favor of the "Atleti Azzurri d'Italia" in 2010 following the repechage of the biancoblù in Serie D.

The Gallaratese then returned to the "Maino" following its second formation, in the 2016–2017 season, only to have to change the facility again the following year, not having found the agreement for the management of the historic city stadium: in 2017– 2018 it, therefore, disputes the internal tenders to Casorate Sempione

References

External links
Team Info Site
Current Squad Site

Football clubs in Lombardy
Sports clubs established in 1876
Association football clubs established in 1909
Serie B clubs
1876 establishments in Italy